Hilda Elvira Carrero García  (December 26, 1951 – January 28, 2002) was a Venezuelan model and actress, known for her participation in series as Las Amazonas, El sol sale para todos, La heredera, and others.

Biography 
In 1973, she participated in Miss Venezuela pageant, representing Tachira state. She got the fourth place, which allowed her to be the official representative of Venezuela to the Miss International 1973 pageant held in Tokyo, Japan, on October 13, 1973, when she classified in the Top 15 semifinalists. She also participated in the 1974 International Coffee Reign, in Manizales, Colombia, where she got the 3rd. place. Later, she studied at University of Santa María, where obtained a Bachelor's degree in Business Administration. Then entered the world of entertainment.

Carrero made her debut as actress in 1975, at the program Patrulla 88, in Venezolana de Televisión. Then, she joined Radio Caracas Televisión, where she performed small roles as an actress. That same year she joined Venevisión to play a co-starring role with Alberto Marín in the telenovela Emilia (1979), starring Elluz Peraza and Eduardo Serrano. She became popular with the  "Mi puchi", a term with which she referred to the man she loved in the plot of the series. 

Her first leading role was in the telenovela Migaja that same year. Along 10 years, she formed a well-known television couple with actor Eduardo Serrano, achieving high levels of audience.

In 1985 she met the Portuguese-Venezuelan businessman Juan Fernandes, whom she married in December 1986. At the height of her artistic career, she decided to leave her profession and devote herself to her marriage. She procreated two children, Joao and Johana Fátima.

In 1991 she returns to television for beginning in animation, specifically on the Televen channel, where she would lead the program La Noche Musical.

In 1997 was diagnosed with cancer. She died on Monday, January 28, 2002, at 9:00 in the morning, at the La Floresta clinic, at 50. Her last wish was that the news of her death be made known to the media after the burial ceremony. Her remains rest in the La Guairita cemetery in the eastern part of Caracas.

Filmography 

 El sol sale para todos (1986) Telenovela .... Magdalena Pimentel
 Muerte en El Barrio (1985) Telenovela .... Lina Suárez
 Las amazonas (1985) Telenovela .... Isabel Lizárraga
 Julia (1984) Telenovela .... Julia
 La Venganza (1983) Telenovela .... Iris
 La heredera  (1982) Telenovela .... Cristina Zambrano García
 Querida Mamá (1982) Telenovela .... María Victoria (Marivi)

 Sorángel (1981) Telenovela .... Sorangel
 Andreína (1981) Telenovela .... Andreína
 El despertar (1980) Telenovela
 Emilia (1979) Telenovela .... Nereida Pardo-Figueroa
 Rosángela (1979) Telenovela .... Leticia

 María del Mar (1978) Telenovela .... María del Coral/ Miriam".
 Migaja (1977) Telenovela 
 Iliana (1977) Telenovela
 Sabrina (1976) Telenovela .... Rosita
 Angélica (1976) Telenovela .... Farina
 Patrulla 88 (1975) Serie

References

External links

</ref>

1951 births
People from Caracas
2002 deaths
Venezuelan television actresses
Miss International 1973 delegates
Death in Caracas